The 2017–18 Welsh Premier League was the 26th season of the Welsh Premier League, the highest football league within Wales since its establishment in 1992. The New Saints are the defending champions. The season fixtures were announced on 23 June 2017. The season began on 11 August 2017 and concluded in April 2018; the Europa League play-offs followed afterwards. Teams played each other twice on a home and away basis, before the league split into two groups at the end of January 2018 – the top six and the bottom six.

On 26 April 2018 the FAW Club Licensing Appeals Body decided to revoke Bangor City's Tier 1 and UEFA licence meaning that they would automatically drop down to the second level of Welsh football the next season and would not be able to compete for a place in the following season's Europa League.

Teams

The bottom two placed teams from the previous season, Rhyl and Airbus UK Broughton were relegated to the Cymru Alliance for the 2017–18 season. They were replaced by Barry Town United and Prestatyn Town, champions of the 2016–17 Welsh Football League Division One and 2016–17 Cymru Alliance respectively. Barry Town United are playing in the Welsh Premier League for the first time since the 2003–04 season, while Prestatyn Town were returning to the top flight after being relegated in the 2014–15 season.

Stadia and locations

League table

Results
Teams play each other twice on a home and away basis, before the league split into two groups – the top six and the bottom six.

Matches 1–22

Matches 23–32

Top six

Bottom six

UEFA Europa League play-offs

Teams that finish in positions third to seventh at the end of the regular season will participate in play-offs to determine the third participant for the 2018–19 UEFA Europa League, who will qualify for the preliminary round. However, due to Bangor City's expulsion, there was just one semi-final, with fifth place Cefn Druids gaining a bye to the final after Bala Town (who had finished 4th) took Bangor's place.

Semi-final

Final

Season statistics

Scoring

Top scorers

References

External links

League rules 

Cymru Premier seasons
2017–18 in Welsh football
Wales